Amburan lighthouse or Nardaran lighthouse - was built on the Kohne Bilgah cape on the Galagaya Upland in 1882. It is an operating lighthouse in the Caspian Sea (Azerbaijan).

History 

The Amburan lighthouse was built in 1882 on the Amburan spit on the Galagaya Upland. It represented a two-storey stone edifice, which was built with a residential purpose. At the side of the building facing the sea, an extension was raised in the form of a protruding porch-vestibule, rising to the level of the second floor with an almost round tower without windows.

A lighting lantern was installed on the second floor of this tower in 1884. As in the case of the Shuvelan lighthouse, it is located in a round glazed room on the all sides, evoking a small glazed rotunda. The Amburan lighthouse differs from all the others by the colour of its light - it has a red glint, shining alternately white and red. Previously, the light was sectorial, that is, directed in a specific direction, but after the reconstruction in 1983 it became circular.

See also 
 Absheron lighthouse
 Boyuk Zira Lighthouse
 Monument to the "Guba" ship sailors

References

Literature 
 Амбуранский маяк. Описание маяков, башен и знаков Российской Империи по берегам Каспийского моря : исправленное по 1 января 1905 года. — Издание Главного Гидрографического Управления Морского Министерства. — С.-Петербург : Тип. Мор. Мин-ва, 1905. — 35 с.

Lighthouses in Azerbaijan
Lighthouses completed in the 19th century
Buildings and structures completed in 1882